Margaret Kathleen Jeffery (23 January 1920 – 12 September 2004) was an English freestyle swimmer of the 1930s, who represented Great Britain in the Olympics and competed for England in the British Empire Games.

At the 1936 Summer Olympics in Berlin, she was a member of the British women's that came sixth in the 4×100-metre freestyle relay. In the 400-metre freestyle she was eliminated in the semi-finals.  At the 1938 Empire Games in Sydney, Australia, she won the silver medal in the 440-yard freestyle contest.

References

External links
Margaret Jeffrey's profile at Sports Reference.com

1920 births
2004 deaths
English female swimmers
Olympic swimmers of Great Britain
Swimmers at the 1936 Summer Olympics
Swimmers at the 1938 British Empire Games
Commonwealth Games silver medallists for England
Commonwealth Games medallists in swimming
20th-century English women
21st-century English women
Medallists at the 1938 British Empire Games